Gamage Amila Shiral Perera (born 2 April 1979) is a Sri Lankan professional cricketer who currently plays for Panadura SC. He is an aggressive left-handed middle-order batsmen and a left arm orthodox bowler. In the off-season, he is the overseas player for English club side East Molesey.

References
 Cricket Archive profile
 

1979 births
Living people
Sri Lankan cricketers
Panadura Sports Club cricketers
Ruhuna cricketers